Mikail A'Lim Baker (born June 19, 1987) is a former American football cornerback. He was drafted by the St. Louis Rams in the seventh round of the 2011 NFL Draft. He played college football at Baylor.

He has also played for the Kansas City Chiefs.

Early years
Baker attended Skyline High School in Dallas, Texas, where he was a two-time All-District 9-5A wide receiver and helped Skyline to the 2004 Class 5A Division I Region II bi-district playoffs. As a senior, he caught 50 passes for 750 yards and eight touchdowns for the 7-4 Raiders and also rushed 12 times for 150 yards and two scores. He returned a kickoff for a touchdown and accumulated 1,000 all-purpose yards in his final high-school campaign. He caught 24 passes for 357 yards and two touchdowns as junior.

College career
2010 was Baker's sixth season of eligibility and in his second season as a defensive back. He played thirteen games and made 49 tackles (39 solo) and broke up three passes and intercepted one. he also returned 18 kickoffs for a 19.6 yard average.

In 2009 Baker was a medical hardship and played in three only games in 2009, predominantly as primary kick returner, before suffering season-ending knee injury. He totaled 227 yards on nine kick returns (25.2 average) in nine quarters played on the season. He also recorded two tackles and an interception in two-plus games as defensive back. In 2008 as a junior he played in 11 of 12 games during and made one start. He made four receptions on the season, for 44 yards and was Baylor's leading kick returner, averaged 25.3 yards on 30 returns with one touchdown. His 25.27 kick return average ranked sixth in Big 12 and tied for 37th nationally.

In 2007, he was a medical redshirt due to a broken collar bone vs. Rice  For the season he caught six passes for 87 yards (14.5 ypc) and had four kickoff returns for 103 yards (25.8 ypr). In 2006, his sophomore season, he appeared in every game as sophomore wide receiver, but made mark on Bears' kickoff return unit. On 22 kickoff returns, averaged 23.73 yards to rank No. 4 in Big 12 and No. 37 nationally. As a true freshman in 2005 he finished seventh on squad in receptions with eight for 158 yards and one touchdown in nine games.

Professional career

2011 NFL Draft

St. Louis Rams
Baker was selected with the 216th pick in the 2011 NFL Draft by the St. Louis Rams. He was waived/injured on August 30, 2011, and subsequently reverted to the team's injured reserve list on September 2, 2011. He was released from injured reserve with an injury settlement on October 16, 2011.

Kansas City Chiefs
Baker was signed by the Kansas City Chiefs on April 17, 2012.

Toronto Argonauts
He was signed by the Toronto Argonauts on March 27, 2014. He was released by the Argonauts on May 7, 2014.

References

External links
Baylor Bears football bio

1987 births
Living people
Skyline High School (Dallas) alumni
Players of American football from Dallas
Players of Canadian football from Dallas
American football cornerbacks
Baylor Bears football players
St. Louis Rams players
Kansas City Chiefs players